Heather Alice Bagnall Tudball (born January 17, 1974) is an American politician from the Democratic Party and is a member of the Maryland House of Delegates representing District 33.

Early life and career 
Bagnall was born in Washington, D.C. She attended Wagner College and Towson University, where she received a B.S. in theatre performances. After college she worked for Disney as part of its cruise line entertainment. In 2011, Bagnall founded Tasty Monster Productions with her partner Luke Tudball.

In the legislature 
In 2018, Bagnall ran for the Maryland House of Delegates to represent District 33. She defeated incumbent Tony McConkey.

Bagnall was sworn in as a member of the Maryland House of Delegates on January 9, 2019, and is a member of the Health and Government Operations Committee, the Health Occupations & Long-Term Care Subcommittee, as well as the  Public Health & Minority Health Disparities Subcommittee.

Bagnall is a member of the Women Legislators of Maryland Caucus, the Maryland Legislative Transit Caucus, and the Maryland Legislative Latino Caucus.

References

Living people
1974 births
Politicians from Washington, D.C.
Women state legislators in Maryland
Democratic Party members of the Maryland House of Delegates
21st-century American politicians
21st-century American women politicians
Towson University alumni